The men's 4×200 metre freestyle relay, or 800 metre team race, was one of six swimming events on the Swimming at the 1908 Summer Olympics programme.  It was the only relay event on the schedule, and the first appearance of the 4x200 in Olympic competition. Each nation could enter 1 team of 4 swimmers.

Results

Semifinals

The fastest team in each semifinal and the fastest losing team from across the semifinals advanced to the final.

Semifinal 1

Semifinal 2

Semifinal 3

Hungary had no competition in the third semifinal.

Final

Hungary led throughout the race until Halmay veered towards the wall and was caught by Taylor (who had only just before passed Rich) in the final 20 yards. Halmay struggled to the finish line, and was hauled out of the pool before he drowned.

Sources

References

Men's relay relay freestyle 0800
4 × 200 metre freestyle relay